Namibia–South Africa relations refers to the current and historical relationship between Namibia and South Africa. South Africa (then part of the British Empire) captured the area now known as Namibia from Germany during World War I and governed it, by the name 'South West Africa', until 1990, when the country gained independence under the name 'Namibia'. During those 75 years, thousands of South Africans settled in the territory and South Africa treated the area as an internal province, imposing apartheid laws in South West Africa as it did in South Africa.

Both nations are members of the African Union, Commonwealth of Nations, Southern African Development Community and the United Nations.

South-West Africa and Namibian independence (1915-1990)

During World War I, South Africa captured and occupied what was then German South-West Africa beginning in 1915. After the war, the League of Nations removed overseas territories from a defeated Germany and they mandated the territory to South Africa as a trusteeship, as a 'Class C Mandate', known as South West Africa. South Africa proposed that it be allowed to annex South West Africa; a proposal rejected by the United Nations General Assembly as successor to the League of Nations; though the South African government refused to accept the United Nations' authority. As a result, South West Africa continued to be administered directly by South African administrators in Pretoria as a province and many white South African settlers came to the country. South African Apartheid was also introduced into the country and led to the creation of tribal homelands for black inhabitants of the country. 

In August 1966, the South African Border War began between the South West Africa People's Organization (SWAPO) and the South African Defence Force. SWAPO's goal was to obtain independence from South African dominance. SWAPO had majority international support and received military assistance from neighboring independent nations, Angola's People's Armed Forces for the Liberation of Angola (FAPLA) and Cuba. In January 1968, the United Nations Security Council adopted United Nations Security Council Resolution 245 which called for South Africa to end the illegal detention and trial South West Africans, and then in March they adopted United Nations Security Council Resolution 246 censuring the South African government for failing to comply. Then in August 1969, they passed United Nations Security Council Resolution 269, declared South Africa's continued occupation of Namibia illegal. The war lasted until March 1990 with South-West Africa winning its independence and the country was renamed Namibia.

In 1993, South Africa ceded Walvis Bay to Namibia: this small enclave was never part of German West Africa and so had not been part of the mandate territory.

Post-Namibian independence (1990-)
In 1994, apartheid ended in South Africa and Nelson Mandela was elected President of the country. Since then, relations between Namibia and South Africa have remained close. There have been numerous visits between leaders of both nations and several agreements have been signed. The economy of Namibia is also closely linked to South Africa in terms of trade and South African companies have a large number of investments in the key industries in Namibia such as mining, retail, banking and insurance.  Namibia contributes greatly to the growth and development of the South African tourism industry. Namibia ranked as South Africa's 9th largest source of tourism.

In 2014, when Namibia was affected by a long drought, South Africa donated 100 million Rand to ease the impact.

Resident diplomatic missions
 Namibia has a high commission in Pretoria and a consulate-general in Cape Town.
 South Africa has a high commission in Windhoek.

References

Further reading
 A New Small State with a Powerful Neighbour: Namibia/South Africa Relations since Independence by Graham Evans, The Journal of Modern African Studies, March 1993

External links
 SA, Namibia push corridor development SouthAfrica.info, 8 November 2010

 
South Africa
Bilateral relations of South Africa
Namibia and the Commonwealth of Nations
South Africa and the Commonwealth of Nations